The year 1701 in architecture involved some significant events.

Events
Sir John Vanbrugh begins work on a house for himself, known as "Goose-pie House" (demolished 1898). At around the same time, he begins work on Castle Howard.

Buildings and structures

Buildings completed

Benjamin Cole House, Swansea, Massachusetts
Bevis Marks Synagogue, London, England (first synagogue built in England)
Dubdi Monastery, West Sikkim, India
Església de Sant Esteve de Bixessarri, Andorra
Hopetoun House, South Queensferry, Scotland, by William Bruce (begun 1699)
 Approximate date - Collegiate Church of Saint Magdalena and Saint Stanisław in Poznań, Poland (begun 1651)

Births
February – Johann Baptist Martinelli, Austrian architect and constructor of Italian descent (died 1754)
April 9 – Giambattista Nolli, Italian architect and surveyor (died 1756)
June – Nicolai Eigtved, leading proponent of the French rococo style in Danish architecture (died 1754)
November 10 – Johann Joseph Couven, German Baroque architect (died 1763)
Francesco Maria Preti, Italian Baroque architect (died 1774)

Deaths
Abraham Leuthner von Grundt, Bohemian master mason (born c.1639/40)

References

architecture
Years in architecture
18th-century architecture